Adnan Ersöz (1917 – 13 October 1991) was a Turkish general, serving as Army General from 1973 to 1977. He was assassinated in 1991. He was Commander of the First Army of Turkey (1975–1977) and, after his retirement, head of the National Intelligence Organization (1978–1979).

References 

1917 births
1991 deaths
Turkish Army generals
Commanders of the Turkish Land Forces
People of the National Intelligence Organization (Turkey)
Assassinated Turkish people
Turkish Military Academy alumni
Army War College (Turkey) alumni